Grunwald Bridge is a suspension bridge over the river Oder in Wrocław, Poland, built between 1908 and 1910. Initially the bridge was called the Imperial Bridge (Kaiserbrücke), then the Bridge of Freedom (Freiheitsbrücke). The architectural design of the bridge was by a city councilor, Richard Plüddemann. The bridge opened on 10 October 1910 in the presence of Emperor Wilhelm II.

It is one of the longest bridges of its kind in Poland, being 112.5 meters long, 18 meters wide, and weighing 2.3 thousand tons. It was constructed of Silesian granite.

The bridge was damaged during World War II but by September 1947 it was repaired and reopened. Presently, the national road 98 and a tram line runs across the bridge.

See also 

 Bridges of Poland
 Siege of Breslau

References

External links 
 Most Grunwaldzki – Kaiserbrücke, Freiheitsbrücke na portalu polska-org.pl

Bridges in Wrocław
Suspension bridges in Poland
Bridges completed in 1910
Art Nouveau architecture in Wrocław
Art Nouveau bridges
Road bridges in Poland